Wilhelmina Cornelia Maria (Anne Wil) Blankers (born 21 October 1940) is a Dutch actress. She was awarded the Theo d'Or in 1976 and 1985.

Selected filmography

References

External links
 

1940 births
Living people
Dutch film actresses
Dutch stage actresses